Garga (Gaarga) is a rural locality (an ulus) in Kurumkansky District, Republic of Buryatia, Russia. The population was 55 as of 2010.

Geography 
Garga is located 38 km northeast of Kurumkan (the district's administrative centre) by road. Zaimka Amatkhan is the nearest rural locality.

References 

Rural localities in Kurumkansky District